Princess Piyamavadi Sri Bajarindra Mata or Chao Khun Chom Manda Piam née Piam Sucharitakul was one of the royal wives of King Mongkut. All three of her daughters became queens.

Her father was the original caretaker of King Mongkut while he ordained, and he passed in the first year of the reign of King Mongkut. Thus H.M. the King patronized his family, bestowed the title Thao (Dame) to his wife, gave her the duties, and sponsored his children.

When her grandson, Crown Prince Maha Vajiravudh (Rama VI) acceded to the throne to be King Vajiravudh, he promoted her as Princess Piyamavadi Sri Bajarindra Mata (meaning: Piam, Princess Mother of Queen Sri Bajarindra).

She had six children with King Mongkut:
Prince Unakan Ananta Norajaya 
Prince Devan Uthayawongse (Later Prince Devavongse Varoprakarn)
Princess Sunandha Kumariratana (Later Queen Sunandha Kumariratana)
Princess Savang Vadhana (Later Queen  Sri Savarindira, the Queen Grandmother)
Princess Saovabha Bongsi (Later Queen Sri Bajarindra, the Queen Mother)
Prince Svasti Sobhana (Later Prince Svastivatana Visishta)

Ancestors 

1839 births
1904 deaths
Chao Chom
Thai princesses
19th-century Thai women
19th-century Chakri dynasty
20th-century Thai women
20th-century Chakri dynasty